Rugby union in Monaco is a minor, but growing sport. In October 2017, Monaco ranked 107th out of 110th national teams according to the World Rugby.

The governing body of rugby union in Monaco is the Fédération Monégasque de Rugby (FMR).

History
Rugby union has a long history in Monaco. The country is surrounded by the main rugby playing area of France on three sides, and coincidentally is not far from Menton, which is where William Webb Ellis, the supposed founder of the game is buried.

Despite this, Monegasque rugby has had serious problems. For example, they have been accused of having one of the worst teams in Europe. They have had serious problems with a pitch, as AS Monaco will not allow them to use theirs, and the team doesn't have any native Monegasques on it. On the other hand, Albert II, Prince of Monaco is a great fan of the game.

See also 
 Monaco national rugby union team

References

External links
 IRB page 
  official union page 
  A.S. Monaco Rugby
 FIRA-AER Monaco page
 Archives du Rugby: Monaco